Ahmed Ruslanovich Dudarov (born 6 July 1992 in Chechnya) is a Russian-born German freestyle wrestler of Chechen heritage. He won one of the bronze medals in the men's 86 kg event at the 2019 European Games held in Minsk, Belarus.

Career 

In 2019, he won the silver medal in the men's freestyle 86 kg event at the Military World Games held in Wuhan, China. In the final, he lost against Artur Naifonov of Russia.

In March 2021, he competed at the European Qualification Tournament in Budapest, Hungary hoping to qualify for the 2020 Summer Olympics in Tokyo, Japan. He did not qualify at this tournament and he also failed to qualify for the Olympics at the World Olympic Qualification Tournament held in Sofia, Bulgaria. In October 2021, he competed in the men's 86 kg event at the World Wrestling Championships held in Oslo, Norway.

Major results

References

External links 

 

Living people
1992 births
Sportspeople from Grozny
German male sport wrestlers
Wrestlers at the 2019 European Games
European Games bronze medalists for Germany
European Games medalists in wrestling
21st-century German people
20th-century German people